Plover was launched at Liverpool in 1788. Her whereabouts between 1798 and 1802 are currently obscure. She became a Liverpool-based slaver in 1802 and made three voyages delivering slaves from West Africa to the West indies before the French Navy captured her in 1806 as she was starting her fourth slaving voyage. The French Navy may have commissioned her as a corvette, but if so her service was brief.

Career
Plover first appears under that name in Lloyd's Register in 1802 with J. Brown, master, and Ward & Co. owners.  

Captain John Brown sailed from Liverpool on 26 June 1802, bound for the Bight of Biafra and Gulf of Guinea islands. He gathered his slaves at New Calabar. He stopped first at the Bahamas, but then delivered the slaves to Havana, arriving there on 17 December. On the voyage four of Plovers crew died. Brown had embarked 348 slaves and disembarked 313, for a 10.1% loss rate. Plover sailed for England on 6 March 1803 and arrived at Liverpool on 9 April. 

Captain Brown acquired a letter of marque on 23 May 1803. He sailed from Liverpool on 2 June 1803, and again gathered slaves at New Calabar. On this voyage, though, he took his slaves to Kingston, Jamaica. Plover arrived there on 23 December 1803. Two of her crew of 48 died on the voyage. Brown had embarked 344 slaves and disembarked 309, for a loss rate of 10.2%. Plover sailed from Jamaica on 23 March 1804 and arrived at Liverpool on 21 May 1804.

Captain Brown Sailed from Liverpool on 27 July 1804, bound for the Bight of Biafra and Gulf of Guinea islands. He gathered his slaves at Bonny and arrived at Kingston on 10 February 1805. On the voyage six of the 38 crew men on Plover died. Brown had embarked 278 slaves and disembarked 250, for a loss rate of 10.1%. Plover sailed for England on 20 April 1805 and arrived at Liverpool on 5 July.

Lloyd's Register for 1805 shows her master changing from J. Brown to Cummins and her owner from Ward & Co. to Braid & Co.

Captain John Cummins acquired a letter of marque on 30 July 1805 He sailed from Liverpool on 25 September 1805. Lloyd's List reported that Plover, Cummings. master, and put into Lisbon on 12 October.

Fate
In 1806 the French frigate  was part of a squadron under Commodore Jean-Marthe-Adrien L'Hermite, along with the 74-gun Régulus, the frigate Président and the brig-corvette Surveillant. During L'Hermite's expedition, she took part in the capture of the brig  and of about 20 merchantmen, notably  and Plowers.

The French captured Plover before she had embarked any slaves. On 13 June 1806, Lloyd's List reported that the French L'Orient Squadron had captured Aurora, Bridge, master, and Plover, of Liverpool, Cummings, master, off the coast of Africa. The French put both crews on Aurora, which then returned to Liverpool. 

The French took Plover back to France. The Navy may have commissioned her as Plowers, but if so, only briefly. Her ultimate fate is unknown.

Notes, citations, and references
Notes

Citations

References
 
 
 
 

1788 ships
Age of Sail merchant ships of England
Liverpool slave ships
Captured ships